Guatemoonops is a genus of spiders in the family Oonopidae. It was first described in 2015 by Bolzern, Platnick & Berniker. , it contains 6 species, from Guatemala and Mexico.

Species
Guatemoonops comprises the following species:
Guatemoonops augustin Bolzern, Platnick & Berniker, 2015
Guatemoonops chilasco Bolzern, Platnick & Berniker, 2015
Guatemoonops jaba Bolzern, Platnick & Berniker, 2015
Guatemoonops purulha Bolzern, Platnick & Berniker, 2015
Guatemoonops rhino Bolzern, Platnick & Berniker, 2015
Guatemoonops zacapa Bolzern, Platnick & Berniker, 2015

References

Oonopidae
Araneomorphae genera
Spiders of Central America
Spiders of Mexico